This is a list of the tallest completed buildings, towers and other structures by country. The list includes the tallest buildings and structures for each country, and, where appropriate, it also points to more detailed country-specific lists.

Africa

Algeria

Kenadsa longwave transmitter, 
Tipaza Longwave Transmitter, 
Ain Beida Transmitter, Ain Beida, 
Les Trembles Transmitter, Les Trembles, 
Bahia Center, 
Maqam Echahid,

Egypt

El-Mahalla El-Kubra TV Mast, 
Suez Canal overhead line crossing, 
Cairo Tower, 
Great Pyramid of Giza, built c. 2570 BC, tallest structure until c. 1300, originally , currently 
Red Pyramid of Sneferu, built c. 2600 BC, world's tallest structure until 2570 BC,

Ghana

 Villagio Vista (Accra),

Kenya

 Britam Tower (Nairobi), 
 UAP Tower (Nairobi), 
 Times Tower (Nairobi), 
 Teleposta Towers (Nairobi), (38 floors)
 Kenyatta International Conference Centre (Nairobi) 
 NSSF Building (Nairobi),

Madagascar

 Imerintsiatosika Radio Mast, Imerintsiatosika, 
 Antananarivo TV Tower, Antananarivo,

Mauritius

Bigara Station Transmitter, Plaines Wilhems, 
Bank of Mauritius Tower, Port Louis, 
Mauritius Telecom Tower, Port Louis,

Morocco

Azilal longwave transmitter, Azilal, 
Noor III CSP tower, Ourzazate, 250 m (820 ft)
Hassan II Mosque, Casablanca, the second tallest minaret in the world
Maroc Telecom HQ, Rabat, 
Casablanca Twin Center, Casablanca,

Niger

Zinder TV Mast, Zinder,

Nigeria

Abeokuta Radio Mast, Abeokuta, 
PRTVC Rayfield Tower, Rayfield, 
New Netim TV Mast, New Netim, 
AKBC Broadcasting Tower, Uyo, 
Large Ikorodu TV Mast, Ikorodu,

South Africa

 Chimney (smoke stack) of SASOL III Synthetic Fuel Production Plant, Secunda, 
 Chimney (smoke stack) of Duvha Power Station, Witbank, 
 Chimney (smoke stack) of Lethabo Power Station, Sasolburg,  
 Carlton Centre, former tallest building in Africa, 
 The Hillbrow Tower, microwave tower, Johannesburg, 
 Sentech Tower and SABC Radiopark, Transmission Tower, Johannesburg,

Tunisia

 Zarzis TV Mast, Zarzis, 
Tour de la nation, tallest skyscraper at (82.54 m)

Democratic Republic of the Congo

 Tower of Limete, Kinshasa,

Americas

Argentina
Omega Tower Trelew, Trelew,  (demolished), formerly tallest structure in South America
Buenos Aires Radio Rivadavia AM Broadcasting Mast, Buenos Aires, 
Torre Espacial, Buenos Aires, 
Alvear Tower, Buenos Aires, 
Le Parc Figueroa Alcorta, Buenos Aires, 
Renoir Towers, Buenos Aires, 
El Faro Towers, Buenos Aires, 
Mulieris Towers, Buenos Aires, 
Repsol-YPF Tower, Buenos Aires, 
Chateau Puerto Madero, Buenos Aires, 
Le Parc Tower, Buenos Aires, 
Torres del Yacht, Buenos Aires, 
BankBoston Tower, Buenos Aires, 
Alas Building, Buenos Aires, 
Madero Office, Buenos Aires, 
Dolfines Guaraní, Rosario, 
Capitalinas Towers, Córdoba City,

Belize
Mayan caana at Caracol 
El Castillo pyramid at Xunantunich

Brazil
Amazon Tall Tower Observatory, Vila de Balbina, Amazonas, 325 m (1066 ft)
Radio Gaúcha AM Guaíba Mast, Guaíba, Rio Grande do Sul, 230 m (755 ft)
Brasilia TV Tower, Brasília, Distrito Federal, 224 m (735 ft)
Millennium Palace, Balneário Camboriú, Santa Catarina, 177.3 m (581.7 ft)
Mirante do Vale, São Paulo, São Paulo, 170 m (558 ft)
Edifício Itália, São Paulo, São Paulo, 168 m (551 ft)
Rio Sul Center, Rio de Janeiro, Rio de Janeiro, 164 m (538 ft)
Altino Arantes Building, São Paulo, São Paulo, 161 m (528 ft)
105 Lélio Gama St., Rio de Janeiro, Rio de Janeiro, 160 m (523 ft)

Canada

 CN Tower, tallest free-standing structure in the world on land until 12 September 2007, when it was surpassed by the Burj Khalifa (officially surpassed when the Burj Khalifa opened, on 4 January 2010)
 Inco Superstack, tallest freestanding chimney in the Western hemisphere, 
 CBC Tower, Shawinigan, Quebec,  (demolished in 2001, replaced?)
 First Canadian Place, tallest building in Canada, built in 1975, 72 floors,  ( to antenna)

Chile
Gran Torre Santiago, 
Titanium La Portada, 
Marriott Hotel, 
CTC Corporate Building, a.k.a. Telefónica Tower, 
Torre Entel,

Colombia
BD Bacatá, in Bogotá (South Tower), the tallest Colombian building
BD Bacatá, in Bogotá (North Tower), 
Colpatria Tower (Torre Colpatria), in Bogotá, 
Cali Tower (Torre de Cali), in Cali, the tallest Colombian structure when including the antenna
World Trade Center, in Bogotá, 
Torre Coltejer, in Medellín, 
La Nacional Building, in Bogotá, 
Caja de Empleados de la Policía Nacional Building, in Bogotá, 
Avianca Building, in Bogotá, 
Coffee Tower, in Medellín, 
Colseguros Building, in Bogotá, 
Building of the Offices of the Comptroller General, in Bogotá,

Cuba
FOCSA Building, 36 floors
Camagüey TV Mast, 238 m (780 ft)
Televilla, 207 m (680 ft)
Hotel Melia Cohiba

Dominican Republic
Torre Anacaona 27, Anacaona, Santo Domingo, 41 floors, 
Torre Caney Anacaona, Santo Domingo, 42 floors, 
Monumento de Santiago, Santiago de los Caballeros, 
Torres mar Azul, 140m, Santo Domingo, 40 floors tower 1 and 3, 127m, 35 floors
Silver Sun Gallery, 135m, 34 floors, Santo Domingo
Malecon Center 1, Malecon, Santo Domingo, 31 floors, 
Malecon Center 2, Malecon, Santo Domingo, 31 floors, 
Malecon Center 3, Malecon, Santo Domingo, 31 floors, 
Torre Azul, Santo Domingo, 27 floors and  + spire 
Park Towers, 120m, 30 floors (tower 2), Santo Domingo
Torre Citibank, Winston Churchill Avenue, Santo Domingo, 25 floors, 
Alco Paradiso, 117m, 25 floors, Santo Domingo
Torre del Conservatorio, 115m, 25 floors, Santo Domingo la esperillat
Torre del Sol, 114m, 25 floors, Santo Domingo

Ecuador
Banco La Previsora, in Guayaquil,   33 stories

El Salvador
Multiplaza Apartamentos, ~ currently tallest in the country

Mexico
 Torre KOI, Monterrey Metropolitan Area, to be completed in 2017
 Torre Reforma, Mexico City
 Torre BBVA Bancomer, Mexico City
 Torre Mayor, Mexico City
 Hotel RIU Plaza Guadalajara, Guadalajara
 Torre Ejecutiva Pemex, Mexico City
 Torre Altus, Mexico City
 Torre Latinoamericana, Mexico City
 World Trade Center México, Mexico City
 Torre Aura Altitude, Guadalajara
 Torre CNCI, Monterrey
 Arcos Bosques Corporativo, Mexico City
 St. Regis Hotel & Residences, Mexico City
 Torre Lomas, Mexico City
 Hotel Nikko Mexico, Mexico City
 Santa Fe Pads, Mexico City
 City Santa Fe Torre Amsterdam, Mexico City
 Torres Altaire 1,2,4,  (under construction), Mexico City
 Panorama Santa Fe, Mexico City
 Torre HSBC, Mexico City
 Edifício Latino, Monterrey
 Torre del Caballito, Mexico City
 Torre Mural, Mexico City
 Torre Mexicana de Aviación, Mexico City
 Presidente InterContinental Hotel, Mexico City
 Torre Milán, Mexico City
 Residencial del Bosque 1,2, Mexico City
 Torre Reforma Axtel, Mexico City
 Torre Ejecutiva JV 4,  (under construction), Puebla
 Torre Banobras, Mexico City
 Torre Reforma 222, Mexico City

Peru
 Edificio Banco Continental (BBVA),18 floors 
 Westin Lima Hotel in San Isidro, 34 floors, Lima
 Torre del Centro Cívico de Lima, 34 floors, 
 Edificio Chocavento, 25 floors,

Puerto Rico
US Navy Transmission Tower, Aguada, 
Telemundo WKAQ TV Tower, Cayey, 
Cayey Pegasus Broadcasting Tower, Cayey, 
Arso Radio Tower, Cabo Rojo, 
La Cadena del Milagro Tower, Utuado, 
Arecibo Radio Telescope, Arecibo, 
Soleil Building,

Trinidad and Tobago
International Waterfront Tower A Port-of-Spain, 
International Waterfront Tower B Port-of-Spain,

United States

KVLY-TV mast, 
One World Trade Center, 
Willis Tower, Chicago, 1974, 108 floors, 
Trump International Hotel and Tower, Chicago, 92 floors, 
Empire State Building, 102 floors,

US Virgin Islands
Frenchman's Reef & Morning Star Marriott Beach Resort,

Uruguay
CX-6 Radio Mast, Santiago Vázquez, 
Channel 10 antenna, 
Telecommunications Tower (Montevideo), 
Palacio Salvo,

Venezuela
Pylons of Orinoco River Crossing, Caroní, 
Parque Central east tower, Caracas, 
Parque Central west tower, Caracas, 
Mercantil Tower, Caracas, 
Provincial Tower, Caracas, 
Latin Financial center, Caracas, 
Hotel Alba Caracas, Caracas, 
Sindoni Tower, Maracay, 
Citybank Tower, Caracas, 
Movilnet Tower, Caracas, 
CorpBanca Tower, Caracas, 
Polar Tower II, Caracas, 
Humboldt Tower, Caracas, 
Mohedano Residences, Caracas, 
Caroata Residences, Caracas, 
Catuche Residences, Caracas, 
El Tejar Residences, Caracas, 
San Martín Residences, Caracas, 
Tacagua Residences, Caracas, 
Tajamar Residences, Caracas, 
Gran Meliá Caracas, Caracas, 
Torre Banco Plaza, Caracas, 
Previsora Tower, Caracas, 
Caracas Palace Hotel, Caracas, 
BCV Building, Caracas,

Asia

Azerbaijan
Baku TV Tower 
Baku Tower, Baku, 2020, 52 storeys, 
SOCAR Tower, Baku, 2016, 38 storeys, 
Flag Pole

Armenia
TV Tower Yerevan, Yerevan,

Bangladesh

City Centre Dhaka, Dhaka, 2012, 40 storeys, 
BRB Cable Tower, Kushtia, 2021, 40 storeys, 
Hilton Hotel, Dhaka, 2021, 37 storeys,

Brunei
RTB Subok Tower, Bandar Seri Begawan, 2008, tallest structure in Brunei.
Raja Isteri Pengiran Anak Hajah Saleha (RIPAS) Bridge Tower, Bandar Seri Begawan, tallest bridge structure in Brunei
Ministry of Finance Building, Bandar Seri Begawan, 2001, tallest building in Brunei.
Sultan Haji Omar Ali Saifuddien Bridge towers, Tower 1,  and Towers 2 & 3, .

Cambodia
Vattanac Capital Tower, tallest building in Cambodia, completed in 2012
OCIC Tower (Canadia Bank),

China

Shanghai Tower, topped out in August 2013, tallest structure in China
Canton Tower, second tallest structure in China
Ping An Finance Centre, built in 2017, second tallest building in China and 5th tallest in the world
Shanghai World Financial Center, 
Oriental Pearl Tower, 
KK100, 100 floors,
Jin Mao Tower, 88 floors, 
Zhoushan Island Overhead Powerline Tie, tallest electricity pylons in the world, 
Yangtze River Crossing Jiangyin, second-tallest electricity pylons in the world, 
Yangtze River Crossing Nanjing, tallest electricity pylons in the world built of concrete, 
Pylons of Pearl River Crossing, 
Shun Hing Square, 3rd tallest building in Shenzhen, completed in 1996
CITIC Plaza, tallest building in Guangzhou and the tallest concrete building in the world, completed in 1997
Shimao International Plaza, one of the tallest buildings in Shanghai, completed in 2005
Plaza 66 tower one, one of the tallest buildings in Shanghai, completed in 2001
SEG Plaza, currently second tallest building in Shenzhen, completed in 2000
Minsheng Bank Building, tallest building in Wuhan at 331 meters, completed in 2006
Wuhan World Trade Tower, currently second tallest building in Wuhan, completed in 1998
Tomorrow Square, one of the tallest buildings in Shanghai, completed in 2003
Tianjin Radio and Television Tower, Tianjin, China, used primarily for communication; completed in 1991; member of the World Federation of Great Towers
Wusung Radio Tower, Wusung

Hong Kong 

International Commerce Centre, currently the tallest building in Hong Kong at 484 m (1,588 ft), completed in 2010
Two International Finance Centre, 88 floors, 412 m (1,351.7 ft), completed in 2003
Central Plaza, 373.9 m (1,227 ft), completed in 1992, tallest building in Hong Kong from 1992 to 2003
Bank of China Tower, 367.4 m (1,205.4 ft), completed in 1990, tallest building in Hong Kong from 1990 to 1992
The Center, one of the tallest buildings in Hong Kong at 346 m (1,135 ft), completed in 1998.
Cheung Kong Centre, 282.8 m (928 ft), completed in 1999
Nina Tower I, 320.4 m (1,051 ft), Hong Kong, completed in 2006

Macau 
Macau Tower, the tallest structure in Macau
Grand Lisboa, the tallest building in Macau

Georgia
 Tbilisi TV Broadcasting Tower,

India

INS Kattabomman, Tirunelveli, Tamil Nadu, completed in 2013
Rameswaram TV Tower, Rameswaram, Tamil Nadu, completed in 1995
Palais Royale, Mumbai, to be completed in 2017
Fazilka TV Tower, Fazilka, completed in 2007
INS Kattabomman, Central tower, Tirunelveli, Tamil Nadu, completed in 1989
Mumbai Television Tower, Mumbai
Jaisalmer TV Tower, completed in 1993
Samatra TV Tower, Bhuj, completed in 1999
O. P. Jindal Knowledge Centre, Hisar, Haryana
Large Masts of INS Kattabomman, Vijayanarayanam, completed in 1989
 NLC thermal chimney, Tuticorin, 275.5 m
 Coastal energen thermal chimney, Tuticorin, 275.5 m
Dahanu Thermal Power Station's Chimney,, Mumbai, completed in 1995
Chimney of Sagardighi Thermal Power Station, Sagardighi, completed in 2004
Chimney of Korba Power Plant, Korba, completed in 2009
Tata Power Corporations chimney, Mumbai
The 42, Kolkata 268m tall building, completed in 2018
The Imperial, Mumbai, Mumbai, completed in 2010
Pitampura TV Tower, | , Delhi, completed in 1988
Katanga TV Tower, Jabalpur, Madhya Pradesh, completed in 1992
Lodha Bellissimo A&B, Mumbai, completed in 2012
Lodha Bellissimo C, Mumbai, completed in 2012

Indonesia

Indosiar Television Tower, Jakarta, 2006, tallest structure in Indonesia
Gama Tower, Jakarta, 2015, 63 storeys
Wisma 46, Jakarta, 1996, 51 storeys
Sahid Sudirman Center, Jakarta, 2015, 52 storeys
Raffles Tower, Ciputra World Jakarta, Jakarta, 2014, 52 storeys
Pakubowono Signature, Jakarta, 2014, 50 storeys
Sinarmas MSIG Tower, Jakarta, 2015, 48 storeys
BCA Tower, Grand Indonesia, Jakarta, 2014, 56 storeys
Keraton Residence, Jakarta, 2009, 48 storeys
Equity Tower, Jakarta, 2008, 44 storeys
The Peak 1, Jakarta, 2008, 55 storeys
The Peak 2, Jakarta, 2008, 55 storeys
Amartapura I, Tangerang, 1997, 55 storeys
Matahari Tower, Tangerang, 1996, 55 storeys
Amartapura II, Tangerang, 1997, 55 storeys
U residence, Tangerang, 2009, 44 storeys

Iran

Milad Tower, Tehran, tallest structure in Iran
Zibakenar TV Mast, 
Tehran International Tower, 54 floors
Kapsad Development Housing, 38 floors, Tehran
Asseman Tower, 37 floors, Tehran
B3 Tower, 30 floors, Tehran
Imperial Medical Center, 36 floors, Tehran
Sepehr Tower, 33 floors, Tehran
AtiCenter Residential Tower 2, 30 floors, on hold, Tehran
AtiCenter Residential Tower 1, 30 floors, on hold, Tehran
Farmaneih Residential Commercial Tower, 28 floors, Tehran
Golnar Tower, 27 floors, Tehran

Sources:

Iraq
 Umm Qasr TV Mast, Umm Qasr, 
 Basra transmitter, Mast West, Basra, 
 Nahr al Bawadish TV Mast, Buhriz, 
 Al Neser TV Mast, Al Neser, 
 Nineveh TV Mast, Mosul, 
 Bakriya Transmitter, Mast Northeast, Baghdad, 
 Samawah TV Mast, Samawah, 
 Husaibah TV Mast, Al-Qa'im,

Israel

 Dimona Radar Facility, Dimona, tallest structure in Israel
 Chimney 3 of Orot Rabin, Hadera, 
 Chimney 1 of Orot Rabin, Hadera, 
 Chimney 2 of Orot Rabin, Hadera, 
 Azrieli Sarona Tower, Tel Aviv, tallest building in Israel
 Moshe Aviv Tower, Ramat Gan, 
 HaShahar Tower, Giv'atayim, 
 Azrieli Center Circular Tower, Tel Aviv, 
 Azrieli Center Triangular Tower, Tel Aviv, 
 Kirya Tower, Tel Aviv, 
 Leonardo City Tower Hotel, Ramat Gan, 
 Azrieli Center Square Tower, Tel Aviv, 
 Chimney of Reading Power Station, Tel Aviv,

Japan

X-Seed 4000, [Tokyo], Tallest building proposed in Japan
Tokyo Skytree, 
Tokyo Tower, 
Yokohama Landmark Tower,

Kazakhstan
Chimney of GRES-2 Power Station, 1987, world's tallest chimney, 
 Almaty Tower, Almaty, 
 Sarepta transmitter, Sarepta, 
 Novaya TV Mast, Karaganda,

Kuwait
Kuwait Towers Main tower

Kyrgyzstan
 Chimney of Bishkek TEC, Bishkek,

Lebanon
Sky Gate, Beirut, 
Platinum Tower, Beirut, 
Marina Towers, Beirut, 
Habtoor Grand Hotel, Beirut, 
Bay Tower, Beirut, 
Four Seasons Hotel, Beirut, 
Hosn 440, Beirut, 
Beirut Tower, Beirut, 
Ashrafieh Tower, Beirut, 
Atomium 5242, Beirut,

Malaysia

Merdeka 118, Kuala Lumpur, second tallest building in the world
Petronas Twin Towers, Kuala Lumpur, tallest twin buildings in the world
The Exchange 106, Kuala Lumpur, 
Kuala Lumpur Tower, Kuala Lumpur, tallest telecommunication tower in Southeast Asia
Four Seasons Place Kuala Lumpur, Kuala Lumpur, 
Menara Telekom, Kuala Lumpur, 
The Astaka A, Johor Bahru, 
Menara Ilham, Kuala Lumpur, 
Petronas Tower 3, Kuala Lumpur, 
The Astaka B, Johor Bahru, 
Maybank Tower, Kuala Lumpur, 
Vista Tower, Kuala Lumpur, formerly Empire Tower
KOMTAR Tower, George Town, Penang, 
Menara Maxis, Kuala Lumpur, 
Bangunan AMFinance, Kuala Lumpur, 
Pavilion Kuala Lumpur, Kuala Lumpur, > 
Tower A Berjaya Times Square, Kuala Lumpur, 
Tower B Berjaya Times Square, Kuala Lumpur, 
Menara Multi Purpose, Kuala Lumpur, 
Maju Tower, Kuala Lumpur, 
Menara Standard Chartered, Kuala Lumpur, 
Menara Citibank, Kuala Lumpur, 
Kuantan 188, Kuantan, 
Marinara, Kuala Lumpur, 
Grand Seasons Hotel, Kuala Lumpur, 
Menara Dato' Onn, Kuala Lumpur, 
Menara Public Bank, Kuala Lumpur, 
Wisma Goldhill, Kuala Lumpur, 
Alor Setar Tower, Alor Setar, 
Dayabumi Complex, Kuala Lumpur, 
Dynasty Hotel, Kuala Lumpur, 
Hilton Hotel, Kuala Lumpur, 
Le Meridien Hotel, Kuala Lumpur, 
Tabung Haji Tower, Kuala Lumpur, 
MAHA Tower, Kuah, 
KLIA2 Control Tower, Sepang, 
KLIA Control Tower, Sepang, 
Taming Sari Tower, Bandar Hilir, 
MAIWP Tower, Kuala Lumpur, 
Merdeka Square Flagpole, Kuala Lumpur, 
3.228112,101.492670,

Mongolia
Ugii, radio mast, 
Mongolia Power plant-4, chimney, Ulaanbaatar, concrete chimney, 
Mongolia MNB TV tower, Ulaanbaatar, steel tower, 
Ulaanbaatar, Shangrila apartment office and hotel, 35-storey 
Ulaanbaatar, Blue Sky Tower, 25-storey, 
Ulaanbaatar, Tuushin hotel tower, 25-storey, 
Ulaanbaatar, Soyombo tower, 30-storey,

Myanmar

 Yeywa Dam, dam in Kyaukse, 
 Lower Paunglaung Dam, dam in Pyinmana, 
 Laykyun Sekkya, Buddha statue in Monywa, 
 Diamond Inya Palace, Condominium in Yangon, 
 Shwemawdaw Pagoda, Buddhist stupa in Bago,

Nepal
Silver City Apartments, Kathmandu
KL Tower, Kathmandu
Central Business Park, Kathmandu
Nepal Life City Center, Kathmandu
Business Center Nepal, Kathmandu
United World Trade Centre, Kathmandu
Kantipur Publications Building, Kathmandu
Bhat Bhateni Super Market, Kathmandu
Sun City Apartments, Kathmandu
Grande Hotel, Kathmandu
Yak & Yeti, Kathmandu
Guna Colony, Kathmandu

North Korea
Ryugyong Hotel, Pyongyang, 1995, 105 floors,

Pakistan

 Bahria Icon Tower Karachi, 62 storeys
 Bakht Tower Karachi, 38 storeys
 70 Riveria Karachi, 29 storeys
 Ocean Towers Karachi, 30 storeys
 MCB Tower Karachi, 29 storeys
 Centaurus Corporate Tower Islamabad, 32 storeys
 Telecom Tower Islamabad, 24 storeys
 Coral Towers 1 Karachi, 28 storeys
 Coral Towers 2 Karachi, 28 storeys
 Center Point Karachi, 29 storeys
 Centaurus Residential Tower 1 Islamabad, 32 storeys
 Centaurus Residential Tower 2 Islamabad, 32 storeys
 Bahria Town Tower Karachi, 26 storeys
 Mega G4 Corporate Tower Karachi, 28 storeys
 Arfa Software Technology Park Lahore, 17 storeys
 One Constitution Tower 1 Islamabad, 25 storeys
 One Constitution Tower 2 Islamabad, 25 storeys
Dolmen City, Karachi, 23 storeys
 The Center Karachi, 22 storeys
 Habib Bank Plaza Karachi, 22 storeys
 UBL Tower Karachi, 25 storeys
 PIC Towers Karachi, 23 storeys
 Islamic Towers Karachi, 24 storeys
 Lakhani Presidency Karachi, 22 storeys

Philippines

 The Gramercy Residences, Makati, 68 storeys
 PBCom Tower, Makati, 52 storeys plus an 8-level radio tower, built 2000
 GMA-7 Tower of Power, Quezon City, built 1988
 G.T. International Tower, Makati, 47 floors, built 2001
 The St. Francis Shangri-La Place, Mandaluyong, 60 storeys, built 2009
 Petron Megaplaza, Makati, 45 storeys, built 1998
 UnionBank Plaza, Pasig, 49 storeys, built 2004
 The Residences at Greenbelt - San Lorenzo Tower, Makati, 57 storeys, built 2009
 1322 Roxas Boulevard, Manila, 57 storeys, built 2004
 One Corporate Centre, Pasig,  54 storeys, built 2007
 One Rockwell West Tower, Makati,  55 storeys
 Philamlife Tower, Makati, 48 storeys, built 2000
 ABS-CBN Tower, Quezon City, 
 BSA Twin Towers, Mandaluyong, 51 storeys, built 1999
 RCBC Plaza Yuchengco Tower, Makati, 46 storeys, built 2001
 One San Miguel Avenue, Mandaluyong, 38 storeys, built 2001
 LKG Tower, Makati, 54 storeys, built 2000
 Shang Grand Tower, Makati, 46 storeys, built 2006
 Pacific Plaza Towers, Taguig, 53 storeys, built 2001
 Atlanta Center, San Juan City, 
 One Roxas Triangle, Makati, 51 storeys, built 2000
 Robinsons Summit Center, Makati, 38 storeys, built 2001
 The Enterprise Center Tower 1, Makati, 40 storeys, built 2001
 The Residences at Greenbelt - Laguna Tower, 48 storeys, built 2008
 RCBC Plaza Tower 2, Makati, 41 storeys, built 2001
 The Stratford Residences, Makati, 76 storeys, expected completion: 2014
 Metrobank Grand Hyatt Residences, Taguig, 318 m 1043 ft 66 storeys, expected completion 2017
 Discovery Primea, Makati, 68 storeys, under construction (EC 2014)
 The Knightsbridge Residences, Makati, 60 storeys, under construction (EC 2013)

Qatar
 Aspire Tower, Doha
 Al Jamiliyah TV Transmitter, Large Mast, Al Jamiliyah,

Saudi Arabia

Jeddah Tower, Jeddah, 
Abraj Al Bait Towers, Mecca, 
Qurayyat Transmitter, Mast 1, Qurayyat, 
Qurayyat Transmitter, Mast 2, Qurayyat, 
Kingdom Centre, Riyadh, 
Al Faisaliyah Center, Riyadh, 
Jeddah TV Tower, Jeddah, 
National Commercial Bank, Jeddah, 
Jeddah City Hall, Jeddah, 
Islamic Development Bank, Jeddah, 
Riyadh TV Tower, Riyadh,

Singapore

Tanjong Pagar Centre, 2016, 
OUB Centre, 1986, 
Republic Plaza, 1996, 
UOB Plaza One, 1992, 
Capital Tower, 2000, 
Sky Suites @ Anson, 2014, 
Altez @ Enggor Street, 2014, 
One Raffles Quay North Tower, 2009, 
The Sail @ Marina Bay, 2009, 
Marina Bay Financial Centre, 2009,  
Ocean Financial Centre, 2011, 
CapitaGreen, 2014, 
8 Shenton Way, 1986, 
Swissôtel The Stamford, 1986,

South Korea

 Lotte World Tower, Seoul, 123 floors,  (tallest building in South Korea and 5th tallest in the world since 2016)
 Northeast Asia Trade Tower, Incheon, 68 floors,  (topped out, opens March 2011, second tallest building in South Korea)
 AIG Main Tower, Seoul, 80 floors, 
 Samsung Tower Palace (Tower G), Seoul, 73 floors, completed in 2004
 Mok-dong Hyperion I, Seoul, 69 floors, 
 63 Building, Seoul, 60 floors,  (completed 1985)

Sri Lanka

 Lotus Tower Transmission Tower, 
 The One: The One Tower, Residential 
 The One: Ritz Carlton Hotel and Residences 
 Altair:Straight Tower  
 Grand Hyatt 
 Altair: Sloping Tower	
 One Galle Face:Residential Tower 1 
 One Galle Face:Residential Tower 2 
 Clearpoint Residencies
 Colombo City Centre
 Kokavil Tower
 World Trade Center 1
 World Trade Center 2
 Jetavanaramaya Stupa, 
 Royal Park Tower 1 
 Royal Park Tower 2

Syria
 Mount Qarrah Chouk TV Mast, Tepke,

Taiwan (Republic of China)

Taipei 101, Taipei,  -
Tuntex Sky Tower, Kaohsiung, 
Taipei Nan Shan Plaza, Taipei, 
Farglory THE ONE, Kaohsiung, 
Fubon Xinyi A25, Taipei, 
Shin Kong Life Tower, Taipei, 
Chang-Gu World Trade Center, Kaohsiung, 
Far Eastern Mega Tower, New Taipei, 
Cathay Landmark, Taipei, 
Farglory Financial Center, Taipei,

Thailand

MahaNakhon, Bangkok 
Baiyoke Tower II, Bangkok, tallest hotel in southeast Asia, tallest skyscraper in Thailand
The River South Tower, Bangkok, 
State Tower, Bangkok, southeast Asia's biggest single tower
Centara Grand at CentralWorld, Bangkok, 
Reflection Jomtien Beach Oceanfront Tower, Sattahip, 
The Met, Bangkok, 
Empire Tower I, Bangkok, 
Jewelry Trade Center, Bangkok, 
The Pano, Bangkok,

Turkmenistan
 Turkmenistan Tower, Ashgabat, 
 Monument to the Constitution, Ashgabat 
 Independence Monument, Ashgabat

Uzbekistan
 Tashkent Tower, Tashkent, 
 Chimney of Syrdarya Power Plant, Syrdarya, 
 Uchkizil TV Mast, Termez,

United Arab Emirates
Burj Khalifa, Dubai, 
Dubai Creek Tower, Dubai, 
Emirates Office Tower, Dubai, 
Al Mafraq Transmitter, Large Mast, Abu Dhabi, 
Burj al-Arab, Dubai, 
Al Jarf TV Mast, Jebel Ali, 
Abu Dhabi Investment Authority Tower, Abu Dhabi, 
NBAD Tower, Abu Dhabi, 
Baynunah Hilton Tower, Abu Dhabi, 
Etisalat HQ Tower, Abu Dhabi, 
Abu Dhabi Commercial Bank (ADCB) Tower, Abu Dhabi, 
Marina 101, Dubai Marina, Dubai, 
Princess Tower, Dubai Marina, Dubai, 
23 Marina, Dubai Marina, Dubai, 
Elite Residence, Dubai Marina, Dubai, 
Rose Tower, Dubai,

Vietnam

Landmark 81 , Ho Chi Minh City, completed in 2018
Landmark 72, Hanoi, completed in 2011
Lotte Center Hanoi, Hanoi, completed in 2014
Bitexco Financial Tower, Saigon, completed in 2010
Bình Dương Television Transmitter, Bình Dương Province, completed in 2005
Ho Chi Minh city Transmitter, Saigon, completed 2009
Keangnam Hanoi Landmark Tower 2, Hanoi, completed in 2011
VTV-Binh Duong Transmitter, Bình Dương Province
Nam Định Transmitter, Nam Định, completed in 2010
Cần Thơ Transmitter, Cần Thơ, completed in 2003
Saigon Times Square, Ho Chi Minh City, completed in 2011
Saigon Trade Center, Ho Chi Minh City, completed in 1997
Trung Hoa Nhan Chinh, Hanoi, completed in 2007
Saigon Pearl-Ruby Tower, Ho Chi Minh City
Sunrise City Block I, Ho Chi Minh City, completed in 2011
M5 Tower, Hanoi
Hung Vuong Plaza || , Ho Chi Minh City, completed in 2008

Europe

Andorra
Caldea, Andorra la Vella, 79 m (262 ft), 18 floors

Albania
Shijak Mediumwave Broadcasting Mast, Shijak, 
ARRT-Mast of Fllake transmitter. Fllake,

Austria
Mediumwave transmission mast Bisamberg, 
Donauturm, 
Millennium Tower Wien, 
Stephansdom,

Belarus
Sasnovy Longwave Radio Mast, Sosnovy, 
Kolodischi TV Mast, Kolodischi, 
Ushachi TV Mast, Ushachi, 
Polykovichi TV Mast, Mahilyow/Polykovichi, 
Novaya Strazha TV Mast, Slonim, 
Smetanichi TV Mast, Smetanichi, 
Vileyka VLF transmitter, Vileyka, central masts, 
Vileyka VLF transmitter, Vileyka, ring masts,

Belgium
VRT Tower Egem, 
VRT Tower, 
South Tower (Brussels), Brussels, 
Finance Tower, 
Rogier Tower, 
Madou Plaza, 
Tour Astro, 
North Galaxy, 
Belgacom Towers,

Bosnia and Herzegovina
Chimney of Ugljevik Power Plant, Ugljevik 
Avaz Twist Tower, Sarajevo, 42 floors, the tallest building in the Balkans
Incel Chimney, Banja Luka 
Bosmal City Center, Sarajevo, 27 floors, the tallest residential building in the Balkans
Bosmal City Center second building, Sarajevo, 25 floors

Bulgaria

 Chimneys of the Maritsa Iztok Complex, 
 Chimney of Pirdop copper smelter and refinery, 
 Venets Transmitter,

Croatia

Chimney of Plomin Power Station, 
Chimney of TE Rijeka, 
Zagreb TV Tower, 
Zagreb Cathedral, 
Zagrepčanka,

Cyprus
Psimolofou radio mast, 
Chimney of Vasiliko Power Station,

Czech Republic
Masts of RKS Liblice 2,

Denmark
Tommerup transmitter, 
Globecom Tower,  (until 1964: Angissq LORAN-C transmitter)

Estonia

Koeru TV Mast, 
Valgjärve TV Mast, 
Tallinn TV Tower, 
Pärnu TV Mast, 
Saint Olaf's church,  (was thought to be  in the 16th century, but more recent research suggest this is unlikely)
Swissotel Tallinn, 
Radisson SAS Hotel,

Finland

Tallest structure: Hollola TV Mast (Tiirismaa), Hollola, 
 Haapavesi TV Mast, Haapavesi,

France

 Longwave transmission masts Allouis, 
 Masts of HWU transmitter, 
 Eiffel Tower,  ( with antenna)
 Tour First, 
 Tour Montparnasse, 
 Millau viaduct,  clearance,  at summit

Germany

TV Tower Berlin, 
Longwave transmission mast Zehlendorf, 
Longwave transmission masts Donebach, 
Directional Radio Mast Berlin-Frohnau, demolished in 2009
Commerzbank Tower, tallest building in Europe 1997–2004,  ( with the antenna)
Ulm Münster, the tallest cathedral church in the world,

Greece

 Kato Souli LF Transmission Mast, 
 Athens ERA-1 broadcasting mast, 
 Athens Tower,

Hungary

Lakihegy Tower,

Iceland
 Longwave radio mast Hellissandur, Gufuskálar, 
 Naval Radio Transmitter Facility Grindavik, Mast 1, Grindavik, 
 Longwave radio mast Eiðar, Eiðar, 
 Naval Radio Transmitter Facility Grindavik, Mast 2, Grindavik,

Ireland

RTÉ Radio 1 Medium Wave guyed mast, Tullamore, tallest structure in the republic of Ireland
Clarkstown Radio Transmitter, 
Mullaghanish Transmitter, 
Poolbeg Chimney 2, 
Poolbeg Chimney 1, 
Power station chimneys, Moneypoint, 
Truskmore Transmitter, 
Three Rock Transmitter, 
Aghada Power Station Chimney, 
Tarbert Power Station Chimney, 
Great Island Power Station Chimney, 
Kippure Mountain Transmitter, 
Kinnegad Cement Factory Chimney,

Italy

Transmitter Caltanissetta, Caltanisetta, 
Pylons of Messina, Messina, 
Unicredit Tower, Milan, 
Allianz Tower, Milan, 
Generali Tower, Milan, 
Torre Telecom, Milan, 
Libeskind Tower, Milan, 
Mole Antonelliana, Turin, 
Palazzo Lombardia, Milan, 
Torre Solaria, Milan, 
Torre Diamante, Milan, 
Torre Telecom Italia, Naples, 
Torre Pontina, Latina, 
Pirelli Tower, Milan, 
Torri Enel, Naples, 
Torre Francesco e Torre Saverio, Naples, 
Crystal Palace, Brescia, 
Matitone, Genoa,

Latvia
Highest highrises:
Z-Towers, Riga,  (under construction)
Saules akmens, Riga, 
Panorama Plaza II, Riga, 
Latvian Academy of Sciences, Riga, 
Latvijas Televizija Building, Riga, 
Highest TV and radio broadcasting towers and transmission masts:
Riga Radio and TV Tower, Riga, 
Valmiera TV Tower, Valmiera, 
Cesvaine transmission mast, Cesvaine, 
Daugavpils TV Tower (ru), Daugavpils, 
Rezekne TV Tower, Rezekne, 
Dundaga transmission mast, Dundaga, 
Kuldīga transmission mast, Kuldīga, 
Aluksne transmission mast, Aluksne, 
Viesite transmission mast, Viesite, 
Ulbroka transmission mast, Ulbroka, 
Mali transmission mast, Mali, 
Liepāja TV Tower, Liepāja,

Liechtenstein
Erbi Radio Tower, Vaduz, 81.26 m (267 ft)

Lithuania

Vilnius TV Tower, Vilnius, 
Europa Tower, Vilnius, 
Pilsotas, Klaipėda,

Luxembourg
 FM- and TV-mast Hosingen, 
 Beidweiler Longwave Transmitter, 
 Dudelange Radio Tower, 
 European Court of Justice Towers, Luxembourg City,

Malta
 Chimney of Delimara Power Station,

Moldova
 Străşeni TV Mast, Străşeni, 
 Mîndreştii Noi TV Mast, Mîndreştii Noi,

Monaco
Odeon Tower, La Rousse/Saint Roman,170 m (558 ft), 49 floors
Le Millefiori, Saint Michel, 110 m (364 ft), 37 floors
L'Annonciade, La Rousse/Saint Roman, 110 m (364 ft), 35 floors
Parc Saint Roman, La Rousse/Saint Roman, 107 m (354 ft), 35 floors
Columbia Palace, Larvotto, 104 m (344 ft), 34 floors

Montenegro
 Mala Rijeka viaduct, 
 Đurđevića Tara Bridge, 
 Mratinje Dam,

Netherlands

 Gerbrandy Tower, IJsselstein,  (1961–1987: ,)
 De Zalmhaven, Rotterdam,  
 Euromast, Rotterdam, 
 Maastoren, Rotterdam, 
 New Orleans, Rotterdam, 
 Delftse Poort, Rotterdam, 
 Westpoint Tower, Tilburg, 
 Hoftoren, The Hague, 
 Montevideo, Rotterdam, 
 Rembrandttoren, Amsterdam, 
 Achmeatoren (Achmea insurance tower), Leeuwarden, 
 Dom Tower, built 14th century, Utrecht,

North Macedonia
Cevahir Towers Skopje 138 m (453 ft)
NRT Center 70 m (230 ft)

Norway

 Troll A platform, North Sea, 
 Longwave transmission mast Ingoy, 
 Høiåsmasten, Halden, 
Tallest Buildings:
 Oslo Plaza Hotel, Hotel in Oslo, 
 Postgirobygget, Officebuilding in Oslo,

Poland

(destroyed 1991) Warsaw Radio Mast, tallest structure built until 2010
FM- and TV-mast Olsztyn-Pieczewo, 
Tallest building:
Palace of Culture and Science, 1955, 
Wooden structure:
Gliwice Radio Tower, 1935, tallest existing construction built of wood

Portugal

Radio antenna in Muge, Salvaterra de Magos, 
Refinery's chimney in Sines, 
Sines Thermal Power Plant's twin chimneys, 
Setúbal Thermal Power Plant's twin chimneys, 
25 de Abril Bridge, Lisbon, 
Vila Nova de Gaia Communications Tower, 
Bridge on road IC8, near Sertã, 
Vasco da Gama Bridge, Lisbon,

Romania

Chimney of Phoenix Copper Smelter, the tallest structure in Romania, and among the tallest in Europe
Romag-Termo Power Plant, Chimney North, 
Chimney of CET Brașov, 
Bod transmitter, 
Galaţi TV Tower, 
Floreasca City Center, 
Globalworth Tower, Bucharest, 2016,

Russia

 Ostankino Tower, 
 Lakhta Center, to be completed in 2018
 Dudinka CHAYKA-Mast, Dudinka, 
 Taymylyr CHAYKA-Mast (demolished), Taymylyr, 
 Inta CHAYKA-Mast, Inta, 
 Central Mast of Imeretinskaya VLF-transmitter, Imeretinskaya, 
 Chimney of Berezovskaya GRES, Sharypovo, 
 Tambov TV Mast, Tambow, 
 Novosokolniki TV Mast, Novosokolniki, 
 Lipetsk TV Mast, Lipetsk, 
 Mosolovo TV Mast, Mosolovo, 
 Lipin Bor TV Mast, Lipin Bor, 
 Selizharovo TV Mast, Selizharovo, 
 Pinerovka TV Mast, Pinerovka, 
 Yershov TV Mast, Yershov, 
 Tula TV Mast, Tula, 
 Rodniki TV Mast, Rodniki, 
 Novo-Bykovo TV Mast, Vladimir, 
 Volga TV Mast, Rybinsk, 
 Kanevskaya TV Mast, Kanevskaya, 
 Stavropol TV Mast, Stavropol, 
 Ust-Kalmanka TV Mast, Ust-Kalmanka, 
 Livny TV Mast, Livny, 
 Sovetsky TV Mast, Sovetsky, Mari El Republic, 
 Smogiri TV Mast, Smolensk, 
 Varaksino TV Mast, Izhevsk, 
 Surgut TV Mast, Surgut, 
 Tsivilsk TV Mast, Tsivilsk, 
 Galich TV Mast, Galich, 
 Belyy Yar TV Mast, Belyy Yar, 
 Alexandrovsk-Sakhalinsky CHAYKA-Mast, Soboli, 
 Petropavlovsk-Kamchatsky CHAYKA-Mast, Sokoch, 
 Ussuriysk CHAYKA-Mast, Pad' Levaja, 
 Bakaly TV Mast, Bakaly, 
 Proletariy TV Mast, Proletariy, 
 Bobrov transmitter, Bobrov, 
 Chimney of Permskaya GRES, Dobryanka, 
 Chimney of Reftinskaya GRES, Reftinskiy, 
 Tower of Bridge to Russky Island, Vladivostok, 
 Chimney of Ryazanskaya GRES, Ryazan, 
 Chimney of Tobolsk TEC, Tobolsk, 
 Chimneys of Kirishi Power Station, Kirishi, 
 Obninsk Meteorological tower, Obninsk, 
 St. Petersburg TV Tower, Saint Petersburg, 
 Chimney of Troitskaya TEC, Troitsk, 
 Mast of Moscow Radio Centre 13, Balashiha, 
 Naberezhnaya Tower C, 
 Triumph-Palace, 
 Main building of Moscow State University, 1953,

Serbia

 Chimney of TPP Kostolac B, Kostolac, 
 Chimney of TPP Nikola Tesla B, Obrenovac, 
 Stubline transmitter, Stubline, 
 Chimney of TPP Nikola Tesla A, Obrenovac, 
 Subotica TV Mast, Subotica, 
Avala Tower 
Ada Bridge, Belgrade, 
Iriški Venac Tower,

Slovenia
Trbovlje Chimney,

Slovakia

Dubnik Transmitter, Dubnik, 
Suchá Hora transmitter, Suchá Hora, 
Chimney of Novaky Power Plant, Nováky, 
Chimney of Duslo, Šaľa, 
Kamzik TV Tower, Bratislava, 
Chimney of Novaky Power Plant-B, Units 1 + 2, Nováky, 
Chimney of Heating station, Bratislava, 
Nivy Tower, Bratislava, tallest building in Slovakia
National Bank of Slovakia, NBS, Bratislava, 
Slovak Television, Bratislava, 
Panorama City Tower 1, Bratislava, 
Panorama City Tower 2, Bratislava, 
Tower 115, Bratislava, 
City Business Center 1, Bratislava, 
Gloria Tower, Bratislava, 
Millennium Tower 2, Bratislava,

Spain

 Torreta de Guardamar, Guardamar del Segura, 
 Endesa Termic, As Pontes, Galicia, 
 Torre de Collserola, Barcelona, architect Norman Foster, 13 storeys,  with antenna
 Torre Caja Madrid, Madrid, architect Norman Foster, 45 storeys, inauguration in 2007
 Torre de Cristal, Madrid, architects Ortiz & De León and César Pelli, 52 storeys, inauguration in 2007
 Torre Sacyr Vallehermoso, Madrid, architects Rubio & Álvarez, 52 storeys, inauguration in 2007
 Torrespaña, Madrid, architect Emilio Fernández Martín de Velasco, 
 Torre Espacio, Madrid, architects Pei Cobb and Reid Fenwick, 53 storeys, inauguration in 2007
 Gran Hotel Bali, Benidorm, Alicante, Archarchitectitect Antonio Escario,  with antenna, highest building in Spain (until 2007) and hotel in Europe
 Besòs power termal station, Sant Adrià de Besòs, 3 chimneys each 
 Torre Iberdrola, Bilbao, architect César Pelli, 
 Torre Lugano, Benidorm, Alicante, 
 Torre Picasso, Madrid, architect Minoru Yamasaki, 45 storeys, 
 Torre Mapfre, Barcelona, architects Ortiz & De León, 44 storeys, 
 Hotel Arts, Barcelona, architects Skidmore, Owings & Merrill, 43 storeys, 
 Torre Agbar, Barcelona, architect Jean Nouvel, 32 storeys,

Sweden

Storbergsmasten, Hudiksvall, 
Jupukkamasten, Pajala, 
Fårhultsmasten, Västervik, 
Gungvalamasten, Karlshamn, 
Vännäs TV Tower, Vännäs, 
Turning Torso, Malmö, 2005, 
Kaknästornet, Stockholm, 1967,

Switzerland

Grande Dixence Dam, Hérémence, 
Towers and masts:
TV Tower Sankt Chrischona, near Basel
Transmitter Monte Ceneri, on Monte Ceneri
Blosenbergturm, completed 1937, near Beromünster
Radio tower Schaffhausen-Cholfirst, near Schaffhausen
Sottens transmitter, completed 1989, near Sottens; the one replaced was 
Uetliberg TV-tower, completed 1990, on Uetliberg above Zürich
Prime Tower, Zürich, completed 2011, Switzerland's tallest building
Messeturm Basel, in Basel, completed 2003, the country's second tallest building
Münster of Bern, in Bern, completed 1893, tallest church tower
Pylon in the artificial lake of Santa Maria, 75 meters, in Lake Santa Maria, completed 1949

Turkey

Denizköy VLF transmitter, 
Skyland Office Istanbul, Istanbul, 2017, 
Skyland Residence Istanbul, Istanbul, 2017, 
Diamond of Istanbul (under construction), Istanbul, estimated completion 2015, 
Sapphire of Istanbul, Istanbul, 2010, 
Polatli transmitter, 
Endem TV Tower, Istanbul, 2002, 
Küçük Çamlıca TV Radio Tower, Istanbul, 2020, 
Mistral Office Tower, Izmir, 2017, 
Spine Towers, Istanbul, 2013, 
Folkart Towers, Izmir, 2014, 
Varyap Meridian Tower 1, Istanbul, 2011, 52 floors, 
Anthill Residence Tower 1, Istanbul, 2010, 54 floors, 
Anthill Residence Tower 2, Istanbul, 2010, 54 floors, 
Allianz Tower, Istanbul, 2014, 44 floors, 
One Tower, Ankara, 2016, 44 floors, 
İş Kuleleri, Istanbul, 2000, 52 floors,  (first tower)
Varyap Meridian Tower 2, Istanbul, 2011, 45 floors, 
Taksim Group Hotel Mersin, Mersin, 1987, 52 floors, 
Sisli Plaza, Istanbul, 2006, 46 floors, 
Tekstilkent Plaza 1, 2000, two towers both 44 floors, Istanbul, 
Tekstilkent Plaza 2, 2000, two towers both 44 floors, Istanbul, 
Çamlıca TV Tower, Istanbul, 1972, 
Selenium Twins 1, 2008, two towers both 34 floors, Istanbul, 
Selenium Twins 2, 2008, two towers both 34 floors, Istanbul, 
Selçuklu (Seljuk) Tower, 2006, two towers both 42 floors, Konya, 
Portakal Residence, 2009, 37 floors, Ankara, 
My Towerland 1, 2010, 42 floors, Istanbul, 
Rixos Bomonti Residence, 2010, 42 floors, Istanbul, 
Akbank Tower, 1993, 39 floors, Istanbul, 
Istanbul Trump Towers 1, 2010, 39 floors, Istanbul, 
Uprise Elite, 2010, 42 floors, Istanbul, 
Süzer Plaza Ritz-Carlton, 1998, 34 floors, Istanbul, 
Polat Tower Residence, 2001, 40 floors, Istanbul,

Ukraine
Kyiv TV Tower, 
Donetsk TV Mast, 
TV Tower Vinnytsia, 
Chimneys of Kharkiv TEC-5,

United Kingdom

Skelton Mast, tallest structure
The Shard, London, Greater London, completed in 2012
Wenvoe Mast Cardiff. Wales. 850 ft
Heron Tower, London, Greater London, completed in 2010
Leadenhall Building, London, Greater London, completed in 2014
8 Canada Square, London, Greater London, completed in 2002
25 Canada Square, London, Greater London, completed in 2001
Tower 42, London, Greater London, completed in 1980
St George Wharf Tower, London, Greater London, completed in 2014
30 St Mary Axe, London, Greater London, completed in 2003
Beetham Tower, Manchester, North West England, 
Broadgate Tower, London, Greater London, completed in 2008
20 Fenchurch Street, London, Greater London, completed in 2014
One Churchill Place, London, Greater London, completed in 2004
25 Bank Street, London, Greater London, completed 2003
40 Bank Street, London, Greater London, completed in 2003
10 Upper Bank Street, London, Greater London, completed in 2003
Strata SE1, London, Greater London, completed in 2010
Pan Peninsula East Tower, London, Greater London, completed in 2008
Guy's Tower, London, Greater London, completed in 1974
The Landmark East Tower, London, Greater London, completed in 2010
West Tower, Liverpool, North West England, completed in 2007
150 High Street, Stratford, London, Greater London, completed in 2012
10 Holloway Circus, Birmingham, West Midlands, completed in 2006
CityPoint, London, Greater London, completed in 1967
Willis Building, London, Greater London, completed in 2007
Euston Tower, London, Greater London, completed in 1970

Vatican City
St. Peter's Basilica, Vatican Hill, 137 m (452 ft)

Republic of Kosovo
Oak Tower , Pristina

Oceania

American Samoa (USA)

Tafuna Telecommunications Building (Tafuna),

Australia

Omega Navigational Mast Woodside,  (demolished 2015)
Mast 0 of Naval Communication Station Harold E. Holt, 
Naval Communication Station Harold E. Holt, 
Q1, tallest building in the Southern Hemisphere
Sydney Tower, 
Australia 108, second tallest building in the Southern Hemisphere
Rialto Towers (often The Rialto), second tallest reinforced concrete building
120 Collins Street, 
101 Collins Street,

Guam (USA)
Oceana Tower II,

New Zealand

Sky Tower (Auckland), the tallest tower (freestanding structure) in the Southern Hemisphere
Titahi Bay Transmitter, 
New Plymouth Power Station chimney, New Plymouth, 
The Pacifica, currently the tallest building in Auckland being constructed 
PWC Tower, business skyscraper in Auckland, 
Vero Center, currently the third tallest building in Auckland, 
The Majestic Centre, the tallest building in Wellington,

Northern Mariana Islands (USA)
Taga Tower,

Papua New Guinea 

 Noble Center, the tallest building in Papua New Guinea, 
 Grand Papua Hotel, hotel building and second tallest building in Papua New Guinea, 
 Star Mountain Plaza, third tallest building in Papua New Guinea,

References